Michael Cormac Newell (born 28 March 1942) is an English film and television director and producer. He won the BAFTA for Best Direction for Four Weddings and a Funeral (1994), which also won the BAFTA Award for Best Film, and directed the films Donnie Brasco (1997) and Harry Potter and the Goblet of Fire (2005).

Early life
Newell was born in St Albans, Hertfordshire, as the son of amateur actors, and was educated at St Albans School. He read English at Magdalene College, Cambridge. He then attended a three-year training course at Granada Television with the intention of entering the theatre.

Career
Newell directed various British TV shows from the 1960s onwards (such as Spindoe, credited as Cormac Newell, and Big Breadwinner Hog), but eventually shifted his focus to film direction.

His first feature-length project was The Man in the Iron Mask (1977), a made-for-television film. His first critically acclaimed movie was Bad Blood (1981), concerning the 1941 manhunt for the New Zealand mass-killer Stan Graham played by Jack Thompson. This was followed by Dance with a Stranger (1985), a biographical drama starring Miranda Richardson as Ruth Ellis, the last woman to be hanged in the UK. For his directorial efforts, Newell won the Award of the Youth at the 1985 Cannes Film Festival.

Newell continued his successes in the film industry with Enchanted April (1991), an adaptation of the 1922 novel by Elizabeth von Arnim. Miranda Richardson won the Golden Globe Award for Best Actress – Motion Picture Comedy or Musical and Joan Plowright won the Golden Globe Award for Best Supporting Actress – Motion Picture.

During this period, George Lucas recruited Newell as one of the numerous feature film directors to direct episodes of The Young Indiana Jones Chronicles.

The comedy Four Weddings and a Funeral (1994) was also critically acclaimed, winning numerous awards, including a César Award (Best Foreign Film), a Golden Globe (Best Actor – Hugh Grant), and a number of London Critics Circle Film Awards (Best Director, Film, Producer, and Screenwriter).

Since these award-winning productions, Newell has directed a number of films in Hollywood, such as Donnie Brasco (1997) (starring Al Pacino and Johnny Depp), Pushing Tin (1999) (starring John Cusack, Billy Bob Thornton, Cate Blanchett, and Angelina Jolie) and Mona Lisa Smile (2003) (starring Julia Roberts, Kirsten Dunst, and Julia Stiles).

In 2005, Newell was presented with an honorary degree of Doctor of Arts by the University of Hertfordshire which has a campus in St Albans, his birthplace. He was also awarded the BAFTA Britannia Award for Artistic Excellence in Directing for his career prior to 2005. Newell became the first British director of the Harry Potter film series with the production of Harry Potter and the Goblet of Fire, the fourth adaptation in the series, which became a major critical and financial success worldwide. Newell is heard briefly as the radio announcer at the beginning of the film.

Newell directed Love in the Time of Cholera in 2007 and Prince of Persia: The Sands of Time in 2010. In February 2011, Newell attended the British Academy Film Awards along with Harry Potter author J.K. Rowling, David Heyman, David Barron, David Yates, Alfonso Cuarón, Rupert Grint, and Emma Watson to collect the Michael Balcon Award for Outstanding Contribution to British Cinema on behalf of the Harry Potter film series.

Continuing to work on adaptations, Newell directed Great Expectations (2012) from the novel by Charles Dickens with Ralph Fiennes, Helena Bonham Carter, and Jeremy Irvine in starring roles. The film had its world premiere at the Toronto International Film Festival.

On Christmas Day in 2016, Newell appeared as a contestant on a special episode of the BBC's University Challenge, representing his alma mater, Magdalene College, Cambridge.

Filmography

Film

Television 

TV series

As executive producer

TV movies
 Sharon (1964) (Documentary)
 Comedy Workshop: Love and Maud Carver (1964)
 The Kindness of Strangers (1967)
 Them Down There (1968)
 The Visitors (1968)
 The Gamekeeper (1968)
 69 Murder – The Blood Relation (1968)
 Blood Relations (1969)
 Arthur Wants You for a Sunbeam (1970)
 Mrs. Mouse, Are You Within? (1971)
 Big Soft Nelly Mrs. Mouse (1971)
 Baa Baa Black Sheep (1974)
 The Gift of Friendship (1974)
 The Boundary (1975)
 The Midas Connection (1975)
 Lost Yer Tongue? (1975)
 Of the Fields, Lately (1976)
 The Man in the Iron Mask (1977)
 The Fosdyke Saga (1977)
 Little Girls Don't (1978)
 Blood Feud (1983)
 Birth of a Nation (1983)
 The Whole Hog (1989)
 Common Ground (1990)
 Jo (2002) (Also producer)
 The Interestings (2016)

References

External links

 
 

1942 births
Alumni of Magdalene College, Cambridge
Best Director BAFTA Award winners
English film directors
English film producers
English television directors
English television producers
Fantasy film directors
Filmmakers who won the Best Film BAFTA Award
Living people
People educated at St Albans School, Hertfordshire
People from St Albans